Ypsolopha is a genus of moths of the family Ypsolophidae. It is the type genus of the family and comprises over 120 described species (about 95% of the family's known world diversity).

Distribution
Most Ypsolopha species have been recorded from the Holarctic temperate region.

Description
Ypsolopha species are variable in shape and color and no exclusive superficial features have been established for the group. In contrast, the genitalia of both sexes are remarkably homogeneous.

Biology
Adults are nocturnal or rarely diurnal. Their resting postures are various, but they often have the head down and the lower body up. Ypsolopha acuminata mimics a small broken branch at rest. The larvae usually live in open webs on the leaves of various, primarily woody, plants and mostly feed on a limited range of host plants. They are active primarily at night and have two defensive behaviors that involve wiggling and jumping.

Selected species

Ypsolopha acerella Ponomarenko, Sohn & Zinchenko, 2011
Ypsolopha acuminata (Butler, 1878)
Ypsolopha albiramella (Mann, 1861)
Ypsolopha albistriatus (Issiki, 1930)
Ypsolopha aleutianella (Beutenmüller, 1889)
Ypsolopha alpella (Denis & Schiffermüller, 1775)
Ypsolopha amoenella (Christoph, 1882)
Ypsolopha angelicella (Busck, 1903)
Ypsolopha arizonella (Busck, 1903)
Ypsolopha asperella (Linnaeus, 1761)
Ypsolopha atrobrunnella Ponomarenko & Sohn, 2011
Ypsolopha aurata Moriuti, 1977
Ypsolopha barberella (Busck, 1903)
Ypsolopha blandella (Christoph, 1882)
Ypsolopha buscki Heppner, 1982
Ypsolopha cajaliella Vives, 2003
Ypsolopha canariella (Walsingham, 1881)
Ypsolopha cervella (Walsingham, 1881)
Ypsolopha chazariella (Mann, 1866)
Ypsolopha cockerella (Busck, 1903)
Ypsolopha colleaguella Baraniak, 2007
Ypsolopha contractella (Caradja, 1920)
Ypsolopha coriacella (Herrich-Schäffer, 1855)
Ypsolopha costibasella (Caradja, 1939)
Ypsolopha cristata Moriuti, 1977
Ypsolopha delicatella (Busck, 1903)
Ypsolopha dentella (Fabricius, 1775)
Ypsolopha dentiferella (Walsingham, 1881)
Ypsolopha diana (Caradja, 1939)
Ypsolopha distinctatus Moriuti, 1977
Ypsolopha divisella (Chrétien, 1915)
Ypsolopha dorsimaculella (Kearfott, 1907)
Ypsolopha electropa (Meyrick, 1914)
Ypsolopha elongata (Braun, 1925)
Ypsolopha ephedrella (Christoph, 1873)
Ypsolopha excisella (Lederer, 1855)
Ypsolopha exsularis (Meyrick, 1937)
Ypsolopha falcella (Denis & Schiffermüller, 1775)
Ypsolopha falciferella (Walsingham, 1881)
Ypsolopha flavistrigella (Busck, 1906)
Ypsolopha flava (Issiki, 1930)
Ypsolopha fractella (Chrétien, 1915)
Ypsolopha frustella (Walsingham, 1881)
Ypsolopha fujimotoi Moriuti, 1964
Ypsolopha gerdanella (Busck, 1903)
Ypsolopha helva J.C. Sohn & C.S. Wu, in Sohn et al., 2010
Ypsolopha heteraula (Meyrick, 1927)
Ypsolopha horridella (Tritschke, 1835)
Ypsolopha indecorella (Rebel, 1903)
Ypsolopha instabilella (Mann, 1866)
Ypsolopha japonica Moriuti, 1964
Ypsolopha kristalleniae Rebel, 1916
Ypsolopha leptaula (Meyrick, 1927)
Ypsolopha leuconotella (Snellen, 1884)
Ypsolopha lonicerella Stökl, 1922
Ypsolopha longa Moriuti, 1964
Ypsolopha lucella (Fabricius, 1775)
Ypsolopha lutisplendida Sohn & Wu, 2011
Ypsolopha lyonothamnae (Powell, 1967)
Ypsolopha maculatella (Busck, 1906)
Ypsolopha manella (Busck, 1903)
Ypsolopha manniella (Staudinger, 1880)
Ypsolopha melanocnista (Meyrick, 1938)
Ypsolopha melanofuscella Ponomarenko & Zinchenko, 2013
Ypsolopha mienshani (Caradja, 1939)
Ypsolopha minotaurella (Rebel, 1916)
Ypsolopha mucronella (Scopoli, 1763)
Ypsolopha nebulella (Staudinger, 1871)
Ypsolopha nella (Busck, 1903)
Ypsolopha nemorella (Linnaeus, 1758)
Ypsolopha nigrimaculata Byun et Park, 2001
Ypsolopha nigrofasciata Yang, 1977
Ypsolopha oliviella (Busck, 1903)
Ypsolopha parallela (Caradja, 1939)
Ypsolopha parenthesella (Linnaeus, 1761)
Ypsolopha parodaula (Meyrick, 1938)
Ypsolopha persicella (Fabricius, 1787)
Ypsolopha pseudoparallela J.C. Sohn & C.S. Wu, in Sohn et al., 2010
Ypsolopha querciella (Busck, 1903)
Ypsolopha rubrella (Dyar, 1902)
Ypsolopha rhytidota (Meyrick, 1938)
Ypsolopha saitoi Moriuti, 1964
Ypsolopha sarmaticella (Rebel, 1917)
Ypsolopha sasayamanus (Matsumura, 1931)
Ypsolopha satellitella (Staudinger, 1871)
Ypsolopha scabrella (Linnaeus, 1761)
Ypsolopha schwarziella (Busck, 1903)
Ypsolopha sculpturella (Herrich-Schäffer, 1854)
Ypsolopha semitessella (Mann, 1861)
Ypsolopha senex (Walsingham, 1889)
Ypsolopha seniculella (Christoph, 1872)
Ypsolopha sequella (Clerck, 1759)
Ypsolopha sordida J.C. Sohn & C.S. Wu, in Sohn et al., 2010
Ypsolopha straminella Ponomarenko & Zinchenko, 2013
Ypsolopha striatella (Busck, 1903)
Ypsolopha strigosus (Butler, 1879)
Ypsolopha sublucella (Walsingham, 1881)
Ypsolopha sylvella (Linnaeus, 1767)
Ypsolopha tesselatidorsata Ponomarenko & Zinchenko, 2011
Ypsolopha trichonella (Mann, 1861)
Ypsolopha tsugae Moriuti, 1977
Ypsolopha undulatella (Busck, 1906)
Ypsolopha unicipunctella (Busck, 1903)
Ypsolopha uniformis (Filipjev, 1929)
Ypsolopha ustella (Clerck, 1759)
Ypsolopha vintrella (Busck, 1906)
Ypsolopha vittella (Linnaeus, 1758)
Ypsolopha walsinghamiella (Busck, 1903)
Ypsolopha yangi Ponomerenko & Sohn, 2011
Ypsolopha yasudai Moriuti, 1964

Former species
Ypsolopha scenites (Meyrick, 1909)

References

Ypsolophidae
Moth genera
Taxa named by Pierre André Latreille